Wayne G. Sayles (born March 8, 1943) is an American numismatist and author, who specializes in ancient numismatics, especially coins of Cilicia, which is located in modern-day Turkey. He is a numismatic and military author, having published or contributed to hundreds of books, articles, and papers.

Biography 
Sayles was born in Waukesha, Wisconsin to Wayne F. and Betty J. Sayles. He attended Horicon High School, and upon graduation in 1961 enlisted in the U.S. Air Force. His time in the Air Force included training in Communications-Electronics Maintenance at Keesler AFB, MS, and station assignments in Gander, Newfoundland; Fort Bragg, NC; McCoy AFB, FL; San Isidro AB, Dominican Republic; Incirlik AB, Turkey and McClellan AFB, CA. In 1972 he was commissioned as an officer, following completion (with honors) of Officer's Training School. Following assignments included Commander, 2081st Comm Sq. Goodfellow AFB, TX; Maintenance Control Officer, 2140th Comm Group, Athens, Greece; Commander, Detachment 15, 2140th Comm Gp., Levkas, Greece; Advisor, Air National Guard and USAF Reserve, seven north central states; Team Chief, Air Force Communications Command Inspector General, Scott AFB, IL.

His interest in coins of Cilicia was born during his tour of duty in Turkey.

In 1986 Wayne founded the monthly journal The Celator, which specialized in ancient and medieval coins.

In 2004 he founded the Ancient Coin Collectors Guild (ACCG) an advocacy group for private collectors of Ancient Coins.

Education 
1972 – University of Nebraska at Omaha where he earned a bachelor's degree in History

1972, May – Officer's Training School, completing the program as an Honor Graduate and received commission in the USAF

1986 – University of Wisconsin (Madison), Master's degree in Art History. Presented his thesis on the influence of ancient coins in the work of 17th century Flemish painter Peter Paul Rubens.

Publications 
First to Fall: the story of William Edward Cramsie, Clio's Cabinet, 2008.
With William F. Spengler: Turkoman Figural Bronze Coins and Their Iconography, 2 vols., Clio's Cabinet, 1992–1996.
Classical Deception: Counterfeits, Forgeries and Reproductions of Ancient Coins, Krause Publications, 2001.
Ancient Coin Collecting Vol. I, 2nd ed., Krause Publications, 1996.
Ancient Coin Collecting Vol. II : Numismatic Art of the Greek World (2nd ed.)
Ancient Coin Collecting, Vol. III: The Roman World: Politics and Propaganda (2nd ed.)
Ancient Coin Collecting IV: Roman Provincial Coins, Krause Publications, 1998.
Ancient Coin Collecting V: The Romaion/Byzantine Culture, Krause Publications, 1998.
Ancient Coin Collecting VI: Non-Classical Cultures, Krause Publications, 1999.
The Ned H. and Gloria A Griner Greek and Roman Coin Collection, David Owsley Museum of Art, 2002.

Organizational affiliations 
Ancient Coin Collectors Guild – Founder,
416th Bomb Group Archive – Founder,
416th Bomb Group Veterans Association – Honorary veteran and Command Pilot,
Military Officers Association of America – Life Member
9th Air Force Association – Life Member,
Air Force Communicators and Air Traffic Controllers Association – Life Member,
American Numismatic Society – Life Fellow,
Royal Numismatic Society (London) – Fellow,
Hellenic Numismatic Society (Athens) – Life Member,
American Israel Numismatic Society – Life Member,
Ozark County Genealogical and Historical Society – Life Member,
American Numismatic Association – Member,
Numismatic Literary Guild – Member,
Krause Numismatic Ambassadors – Member,
Gainesville Missouri Lions Club – board of directors

Notes and references

External links 
 Wayne G. Sayles, Official Website of Wayne G. Sayles

American classical scholars
American numismatists
American art historians
Linguists of Etruscan
1943 births
Living people
Scholars of Byzantine numismatics